Dawlish  is an English seaside resort town and civil parish in Teignbridge on the south coast of Devon,  from the county town of Exeter and from the larger resort of Torquay. Its 2011 population of 11,312 was estimated at 13,355 in 2019. It is to grow further as several housing estates are under construction, mainly in the north and east of the town. It had grown in the 18th century from a small fishing port into a well-known seaside resort, as had its near neighbour, Teignmouth, in the 19th century. Between Easter and October the population can swell by an additional 20,000. largely in self-accommodation, caravan, camping and holiday parks (mostly in neighbouring Dawlish Warren)

Description

Dawlish is located at the outlet of a small river, Dawlish Water (also called The Brook), between Permian red sandstone cliffs, and is fronted by a sandy beach with the South Devon Railway sea wall and the Riviera Line railway above. Behind this is a central public park, The Lawn, through which Dawlish Water flows.

Immediately to the south-west of Dawlish is a headland, Lea Mount, with Boat Cove at its foot and Coryton Cove, the furthest part of the beach accessible by the seawall path behind it. There is an Italian food kiosk there. To the north-east, via the beach or seawall, the coast can be followed for some 2 km to Langstone Rock and the resort of Dawlish Warren beyond.

Dawlish is also known for its black swans (Cygnus atratus), introduced from Western Australia, which live with other exotic waterfowl in a small urban sanctuary on Dawlish Water. There are several attractions in and around the town, such as beaches, safari mini-golf, a waterfowl centre, a theatre, a leisure centre with a pool, a countryside park, and the Dawlish Museum.

Toponymy
The name Dawlish derives from a Welsh river name meaning black stream. There was also a Roman translation of Dolfisc, meaning 'Dark river' and 'The Devils Water'. It was first recorded in 1044 as Doflisc. By 1086 it was Dovles; in 1302, Dovelish; and by 1468 it had become the more recognisable Dawlisshe.

History
Before Dawlish itself was settled, fishermen and salt makers came down from the higher ground where they lived, to take advantage of the natural resources available on the coast hereabouts. They built salterns to produce salt and stored it in sheds nearby. The unpredictable nature of the stream, Dawlish Water, during floods is likely to have led to nearby Teignmouth being the preferred site for salt-making, and the practice stopped at Dawlish during the Anglo-Saxon period (400–1000 CE).

The earliest settlement at Dawlish grew up almost a mile away from the coast, around the area where the parish church is today. There is evidence of early settlements at Aller Farm, Smallacombe, Lidwell and at Higher and Lower Southwood, where the ground would have been fertile and not subject to flooding.

The land that includes present-day Dawlish was granted by Edward the Confessor to Leofric, later the first Bishop of Exeter, in 1044. After the Norman Conquest, Leofric gave the land to the Diocese of Exeter, which held it until it was sold, in 1802.

Little of note happened at Dawlish until the end of the 18th century, when seaside locations on the south coast started to become popular with the wealthy, mainly caused by George III making Weymouth in Dorset his summer holiday residence from 1789. In May 1795, the antiquarian and topographer John Swete spent some time in Dawlish and reported that although not long ago it had been no more than a fishing village, and the best lodging house would not cost more than half a guinea per week, it was now so fashionable that "in the height of the season, not a house of the least consequence is to be hired for less than two guineas a week, and many of them rise to so high a sum as four or five."

In the first decade of the 19th century the land between the original settlement and the sea was "landscaped"; the stream was straightened, small waterfalls were built into it, and it was flanked by a broad lawn and rows of new houses: The Strand on the north side and Brunswick Place on the south. The layout survives remarkably unchanged today, despite severe damage from a torrent of water coming down Dawlish Water from the Haldon Hills on the night of 10 November 1810.

Also worth noting are Manor House and Brook House (both about 1800) and some of the cottages in Old Town Street surviving from the old village. Dawlish's transformation from a fishing settlement to a watering hole for Victorian celebrities is documented at the Dawlish Museum.

Brunel's railway
In 1830, Isambard Kingdom Brunel designed an atmospheric railway, which operated on a pneumatic principle, using a 15-inch iron tube. One of the pumping stations was in this town. The line ran right along the seafront, but Brunel ensured that the line was carried across the mouth of the stream on a small granite viaduct, leaving access to the beach.

The railway opened on 30 May 1846 between Exeter St Davids and Newton Abbot. The first passenger train ran in September 1847, but the project was besieged with problems mainly with the leather sealing valve, which after 12 months of use needed replacing at a cost of £25,000. South Devon Railway directors abandoned the project in favour of conventional trains.

Literary connections
After visiting Sidmouth in 1801, Jane Austen spent a long holiday at Dawlish in 1802, later complaining about its "particularly pitiful and wretched library". She mentioned it several times in her 1811 novel Sense and Sensibility. In Charles Dickens' Nicholas Nickleby (1838–39) the protagonist inherits a small farm near Dawlish. The novelist and poet Margaret Holford died in Dawlish on 11 September 1852, aged 84. On March 23, 1818, the Romantic poet John Keats walked the three miles from Teignmouth to Dawlish to visit the Easter Monday fair and subsequently wrote a poem entitled "Dawlish Fair", which details a fantasy of seducing a Devon woman.

Transport
Dawlish railway station, in the town centre next to the beach, offers trains to most stations in Devon and to London, Birmingham, Manchester and further afield. The line includes one of the memorable stretches of British track for its natural environment, but at high cost, as a constant battle with sea erosion makes it one of the dearest lines to maintain. A storm in 1974 washed away much of the station's down platform. In the UK storms of January–February 2014 waves brought down the sea wall and washed away a section of line, leaving the permanent way suspended.

The 2014 storm raised questions about the vulnerability of the South Devon Railway sea wall to storm damage and proposals were made to route Plymouth-bound rail services further inland, by re-opening the disused railway line via Okehampton and Tavistock, re-opening the former Teign Valley Line, or reviving a 1930s GWR project to construct the Dawlish Avoiding Line. In May 2019, Network Rail started to improve the sea defences along the sea wall at Marine Parade, south of the station, promising a wider, more accessible walkway with seating and lighting, and greater protection from the sea.

The A379 road from Exeter to Torbay/Dartmouth/Plymouth runs through the town, parallel to the railway line.

Buses in the town are provided by Stagecoach South West. Services include Hop 2 from Exeter to Newton Abbot, running at least every 30 minutes, an hourly 2B service to Exeter via Marsh Barton, and Hop 22 from Dawlish Warren to Torquay, also hourly, as is the summer 222 open-top bus from Dawlish Warren to Teignmouth. There is a local bus, the 186, linking the centre, hospital and Sainsbury's to the main housing areas.

Climate
Dawlish has a mild, oceanic climate bordering on a warm to cool Mediterranean climate, according to the Köppen climate classification, with low precipitation in the summer period and high rainfall in the winter. Often termed the "English Riviera" along with Teignmouth and Torbay, Dawlish rarely has snow or frost and grows outdoor subtropical plants such as palms, olives, bananas and lemons. Temperatures over 30C or under 0C are infrequent. It is one of the sunniest places in Britain, with an average of nearly 1800 hours a year. Despite more favourable conditions in the summer, the wet autumn and winter can bring copious amounts of rain, and when areas of low pressure move up the English Channel, easterly winds with dramatic storm surges and waves along the seafront.

Local produce
During the early and middle part of the 20th century, Dawlish became known for Devon Violets perfume. Hundreds of varieties were grown in market gardens surrounding the town. Violet escapees can be found growing wild across the area. Lately the town has become known for growing dainthas, freesias, daffodils, tomatoes and strawberries.

Retail and employment

Centred on The Strand, Queen Street, Brunswick Place and Park Road, Dawlish has typical retail facilities for a resort town with gift shops, cafes, a fishing tackle shop, beach/toy shops, bakeries, restaurants and pubs, haberdasheries, ice-cream shops, national chains and many independent retailers. Along Piermont Place, by Dawlish railway station and the seafront, are further ice-cream shops, a restaurant, a cafe and a sports-bar with outdoor seating areas. In recent years, a number of art, craft and antiques shops have opened. At the north-eastern end of the town there is a Sainsbury's supermarket with an Argos facility and a petrol station.

The largest employment sector in the town is health and social work (23 per cent), due to a large number of care homes, followed by accommodation and food services (20 per cent).

Religion
The town's places of worship:
Hope Church (DCF)
Dawlish Baptist Church
Dawlish Methodist Church
Dawlish Strand Church (United Reformed)
St Agatha's Church (Roman Catholic)
St Gregory's Church (Anglican)

Schools and education
The primary schools in Dawlish are Gatehouse Primary School, Westcliff Primary School and Orchard Manor School. Dawlish College (formerly Dawlish Community College) in Elm Grove Road is the main secondary school. Oakwood Court College is a specialist residential college based in Dawlish, with a satellite college in Torpoint.

Governance
Locally, Dawlish is governed by Dawlish Town Council, which is currently controlled by the Liberal Democrats, as is the next local-government layer above, Teignbridge District Council. Dawlish lies in the parliamentary constituency of Newton Abbot and is currently represented by Conservative MP Anne Marie Morris, who won re-election in the 2019 general election.

Twinning
Dawlish is twinned with the Breton commune of Carhaix-Plouguer in France.

See also
Dawlish, South Australia

References

External links

Dawlish Town Council

 
Seaside resorts in England
Towns in Devon
Beaches of Devon